Bridport Priory was a priory in  Dorset, England.

An inventory of goods belonging to the Priory of St John the Baptist at Bridport was made on 9 October 1452, including the mass books, vestments and altar goods, the furniture of the hall and pantry, and the kitchen equipment.

References

Monasteries in Dorset
Bridport